María del Pilar Margarita Casajuana Martínez (28 December 1905 – 26 October 1999), known professionally as Maria Alba, was a Spanish-American film actress.

Biography
Signed by the Fox Film Corporation after winning Fox Film contest in Spain, Maria Casajuana came to the United States in 1927 a second cabin class passenger on the S/S Suffern, which sailed from the Port of Le Havre, France, on 16 April, and arrived at the Port of New York, 26 April 1927.

Originally billed as Maria Casajuana, she appeared in 25 feature films, starting with Road House in 1928 and ending with La morena de mi copla in 1946. Her most notable appearances (as Maria Alba) were probably as "Saturday" in the 1932 Douglas Fairbanks film Mr. Robinson Crusoe, and as the exotic "Princess Nadji" in the Bela Lugosi serial The Return of Chandu. Other Latin actresses working in films, like Lupe Vélez or Dolores del Río, became fluent in English, but Maria Alba spoke English with a thick accent, which limited her casting opportunities.

Publicity materials for The Return of Chandu, published in 1934, disclosed that Maria Alba's married name was Mrs. David Todd. On July 9, 1950, she married Richard J. Burk; the couple had three children.

Partial filmography

Her Blue, Black Eyes (1927, Short)
A Girl in Every Port (1928) - Maria Buenjolla / Chiquita - Girl in Rio de Janeiro
Road House (1928) - Spanish Marla
Blindfold (1928) - Pepita
Joy Street (1929) - Agnes
Hell's Heroes (1929) - Carmelita
Charros, gauchos y manolas (1930) - Spanish artist
El cuerpo del delito (1930) - Señorita Delroy
La fuerza del querer (1930) - Shirley
Olimpia (1930) - Princess Olimpia
Los que danzan (1930) - Norma Brady
El código penal (1931) - Mary Brady
Road of Hell (1931) - Angela
Su última noche (1931) - Elena Desano
Just a Gigolo (1931) - A French Wife
Goldie (1931) - Dolores
La ley del harem (1931) - Fatima
Almost Married (1932) - Mariette (uncredited)
Mr. Robinson Crusoe (1932) - Saturday
Hypnotized (1932) - Princess Mitzi
Kiss of Araby (1933) - Dolores Mendez
The Return of Chandu (1934) - Nadji - Princess of Egypt
Flirting with Danger (1934) - Rosita
West of the Pecos (1934) - Dolores
Great God Gold (1935) - Elena Nitto
El Hijo de Nadie (1946, Mexico)
La Morena de Mi Colpa (1946, Mexico) - Pepa (final film role)

References

External links

 
 Maria Alba at Virtual History

Actresses from Barcelona
American silent film actresses
Spanish emigrants to the United States
Deaths from Alzheimer's disease
1905 births
1999 deaths
American film actresses
American people of Catalan descent
Spanish film actresses
Spanish silent film actresses
Actresses from San Diego
Deaths from dementia in California
20th-century American actresses